Dwarakanath or Dwarkanath is both a given name and a surname. Notable people with the name include:

Dwarkanath Tagore (1794-1846), Indian industrialists
Bungle Shama Rao Dwarakanath (born 1942), Indian actor
Bilikere Dwarakanath (born 1955), Indian biologist

See also
Sir Chintaman Dwarakanath Deshmukh